Ralph Richards (November 22, 1809 – February 23, 1883) was an American politician from New York.

Life
He was born on November 22, 1809, in Weathersfield, Windsor County, Vermont, the son of Eli Richards (1778–1858) and Amanda Richards. In 1813, the family removed to Hampton, Washington County, New York. Ralph Richards became a school teacher. On April 23, 1838, he married Harriet Leland (1820–1847), and they had a daughter who died aged 7 years. On January 12, 1848, he married Mary Richardson (born 1820), and they had five children.

He was a member of the New York State Assembly (Washington Co., 2nd D.) in 1858; and of the New York State Senate (12th D.) in 1862 and 1863.

He died on February 23, 1883; and was buried at the Hampton Flats Cemetery in Hampton.

Sources

External links
 

1809 births
1883 deaths
Republican Party New York (state) state senators
People from Weathersfield, Vermont
Republican Party members of the New York State Assembly
People from Hampton, New York
19th-century American politicians